Kadıköy Anatolian High School, also commonly known as Kadıköy Maarif College, abbreviated Kadıköy Maarif or KAL, is one of the oldest, most prestigious Anatolian High Schools and internationally renowned high schools of Turkey; located in Moda, Istanbul. The education languages are Turkish and English. Secondary foreign language offered is German.

History
The original building, which unfortunately exists no more, dates back to before World War I and was built by the Franciscan Capuchin Order. The building was inhabited by the followers of this sect for many years. After the National Ministry of Education decided to open a high school in Kadikoy district, negotiations that lasted many years took place between the ministry and the Capuchins. In 1955 the school opened as Kadıköy Maarif. In 1968 a second building was added to the school which served as a dormitory. In 1976 and 1977 two more buildings were added. For many years it was ranked as the biggest highschool in the Balkans.

After a new education structure was established by the Ministry of Education, the School's name changed from Kadıköy Maarif Koleji to its present name, Kadıköy Anadolu Lisesi (KAL). Like Galatasaray High School and Istanbul High School, it used to have a 2-year English preparation period with a following independent curriculum, but in 2006 KAL adopted the regular 4-year lycee education following a 1-year prep period. With over 1500 students, and a 94.1% university entrance ratio, it is, and always has been one of the most important high schools in Turkey.

Headmasters of the school

Kadıköy Maarif College Extracurricular Activities

Publications

 Martı (The Literature Magazine published quarterly)
 Echo (The School's Newspaper published monthly)
 Kadıköy Maarif (Quarterly Magazine published by Kalid, Writers are all graduates)

Sports

Music

Clubs

Notable alumni
 Mehmet Ufuk Uras, politician
 Utkan Demirci, scientist
 Acun Ilıcalı, artist
 Altan Erkekli, artist
 Nilgun Marmara, author
 Seyhan Erözçelik, author
 Bülent Ortaçgil, musician
 Hasret Gültekin, musician
 Mazhar Alanson, musician
 Mert Yücel, musician
 Derya Büyükuncu, swimmer
 Erdil Yaşaroğlu, cartoonist
 Ozan Çolakoğlu, musician
 Derya Büyükuncu, swimmer

Notes

References 
 History of the school from the official school webpage, for the period between 1955 and 2013. (in Turkish).
 History of the school from the official Education Aware webpage, for the period between 1955 and 2013. (in Turkish).
 A documentary about the school, served through their official Education Aware webpage.

External links
Kadıköy Anadolu Lisesi official website
http://www.kalid.org.tr - Kadıköy Maarif College and Anatolian High School Graduate's Association
http://www.kalev.org.tr - Kadıköy Anadolu Lisesi Education Aware
http://www.kalmun.gen.tr - Kadıköy Anadolu Lisesi Model United Nations Conference
http://www.mukal.org - Engineering Applications Club Official Website

High schools in Istanbul
Educational institutions established in 1955
Kadıköy
1955 establishments in Turkey
Anatolian High Schools